Julia Beloglazova (born 28 December 1987) is a Ukrainian pair skater. With former partner Andrei Bekh, she is the 2006 Ukrainian national champion. They placed 18th at the 2006 Winter Olympics.

Programs 
(with Bekh)

Competitive highlights
(with Bekh)

References

External links 

 

Ukrainian female pair skaters
Figure skaters at the 2006 Winter Olympics
Olympic figure skaters of Ukraine
1987 births
Living people
Sportspeople from Kyiv
Competitors at the 2005 Winter Universiade